Denis Sokolov (born 19 March 1983 in Irkutsk) is a Russian rifle shooter. He competed in the 50 m rifle three positions event at the 2012 Summer Olympics, where he placed 18th.

World record

References

1983 births
Living people
Russian male sport shooters
Olympic shooters of Russia
Shooters at the 2012 Summer Olympics
Sportspeople from Irkutsk